Bloomingdale School District 13 is an elementary school district headquartered in Bloomingdale, Illinois.

 it has about 1,225 students. The district operates three schools: Westfield Middle School and two elementary schools: DuJardin Elementary School and Erickson Elementary School.

Schools
DuJardin, named after children's literature author Rosamond Neal DuJardin, opened in 1964 on land formerly owned by its namesake's family.  the school has 382 students.

Erickson, named after former district assistant superintendent William L. Erickson (died 1990), opened in 1993.  it has 476 students. It is, as of that year, the newest school in the district.

Westfield opened in 1975, and as of 2017 it has 433 students and about 60 employees. Its name is a combination of the area subdivisions Fairfield and Westlake.

References

External links
 
School districts in DuPage County, Illinois
Bloomingdale, Illinois